Killgore may refer to:

People
 Andrew Killgore, American diplomat
 Sarah Killgore Wertman, American lawyer
 Edith Killgore Kirkpatrick, American music educator

Places
 Joseph Killgore House, Delaware, United States
 Killgore Hall, Delaware, United States

Fiction
 Killgore, an antagonist from My Life as a Teenage Robot

See also
 Kilgore (disambiguation)